William Heinrich Jacobs (November 26, 1831September 11, 1882) was a German American immigrant, banker, and Democratic politician.  He served two years in the Wisconsin State Senate, representing the southern half of Milwaukee County.  During the American Civil War, he served as colonel of the 26th Wisconsin Infantry Regiment (a German regiment) in the Union Army.  He is the namesake of the town of Jacobs, Wisconsin.  His name is sometimes anglicized as William Henry Jacobs.

Early life 
Wilhelm Heinrich Jacobs was born on November 26, 1831, in the municipality of Holzen, in what was then the Duchy of Brunswick in central Germany.  He was the only son of Christian Jacobs and Christiana Koch. Jacobs emigrated to the United States in 1850, settling first at St. Louis, Missouri, then moving to Milwaukee, Wisconsin, in 1851.  In Milwaukee, he worked as a court clerk, purchased land, and established the Second Ward Savings Bank (1855). On November 11, 1857, he married Caroline Schmidt; they had nine children, though only six survived to adulthood—five daughters and one son.

American Civil War 
During the American Civil War, Jacobs was an appointed colonel of the 26th Wisconsin Volunteer Infantry Regiment on August 17, 1862. He was wounded while in command of his regiment at its first engagement, the Battle of Chancellorsville, on May 2, 1863. Jacobs then left the regiment on a leave of absence before resigning due to his wounds on January 11, 1864.

Later life 
In 1874 Jacobs was elected as a Democrat to the Wisconsin State Senate, where he served from 1875 to 1877. He died on September 11, 1882, in Milwaukee, Wisconsin.

Legacy 
The Town of Jacobs in Ashland County, Wisconsin, was named in his honor. The Second Ward Savings Bank, established by Jacobs in 1855, is now home to the Milwaukee County Historical Society.

References

External links
 

|-

German emigrants to the United States
Politicians from Milwaukee
People of Wisconsin in the American Civil War
Businesspeople from Wisconsin
Wisconsin state senators
1831 births
1882 deaths
19th-century American politicians
19th-century American businesspeople